Lia Bronsard (b. 14 March 1963) is a Canadian mathematician and the former president of the Canadian Mathematical Society. She is a professor of mathematics at McMaster University.

Contributions
In her research, she has used geometric flows to model the interface dynamics of reaction–diffusion systems.
Other topics in her research include pattern formation, grain boundaries, and vortices in superfluids.

Education and career
Bronsard is originally from Québec. She did her undergraduate studies at the Université de Montréal, graduating in 1983,
and earned her PhD in 1988 from New York University under the supervision of Robert V. Kohn.

After short-term positions at Brown University, the Institute for Advanced Study, and Carnegie Mellon University, she moved to McMaster in 1992. She was president of the Canadian Mathematical Society for 2014–2016.

Recognition
Bronsard was the 2010 winner of the Krieger–Nelson Prize.
In 2018 the Canadian Mathematical Society listed her in their inaugural class of fellows.

Selected publications

References

External links
Home page

1963 births
Living people
Canadian mathematicians
Canadian women academics
Women mathematicians
Université de Montréal alumni
New York University alumni
Academic staff of McMaster University
Fellows of the Canadian Mathematical Society
Presidents of the Canadian Mathematical Society
Academics from Quebec